Željko Šakić (born April 14, 1988) is a Croatian professional basketball player for Lietkabelis Panevėžys of the Lithuanian Basketball League and the EuroCup.

Playing history
Šakić started playing basketball in the Cibona youth systems but never got an opportunity to play for the senior squad. After he almost quit basketball, in 2007 he got an offer from another club from Zagreb, Dubrava where he spent the next 3 seasons. After that he spent 3 seasons in the Bosnian League and then moved to Sutor Montegranaro of the Italian League. He spent the 2014–15 season in Manresa of the Spanish League earning the 4th week Player of the Week award.

In August 2015 he moved to the Bulgarian champion Lukoil Academic.

On June 29, 2016, Šakić signed with Cibona. After a season spent playing in the Romanian League for U BT Cluj-Napoca, in September 2018 he moved to the Polish side Stelmet Zielona Góra.

On June 25, 2020, he has signed with Avtodor of the VTB United League.

In March, 2022, Šakić signed with UNICS for the rest of the season.

Croatian national team
Šakić was part of the Croatian national team youth selections. He was one of the leading Croatian players at the 2006 FIBA Europe Under-18 Championship and the 2008 FIBA Europe Under-20 Championship, but to play with the senior team he had to wait for the 2015 EuroBasket preparation games. At the age of 27, he was the oldest debutant in the history of the Croatian national basketball team.

References

External links
Željko Šakić at aba-liga.com
Željko Šakić at acb.com
Željko Šakić at fiba.com
Željko Šakić at realgm.com 

Living people
1988 births
ABA League players
Basket Zielona Góra players
Basketball players at the 2016 Summer Olympics
Bàsquet Manresa players
BC Avtodor Saratov players
BC Lietkabelis players
BC UNICS players
Croatian expatriate basketball people in Italy
Croatian expatriate basketball people in Lithuania
Croatian expatriate basketball people in Russia
Croatian expatriate basketball people in Spain
Croatian expatriate basketball people in Bulgaria
Croatian men's basketball players
CS Universitatea Cluj-Napoca (men's basketball) players
Forwards (basketball)
HKK Široki players
KK Cibona players
KK Dubrava players
Liga ACB players
Olympic basketball players of Croatia
PBC Academic players
Sutor Basket Montegranaro players